Bank of Utah is a federally-insured community bank, with corporate headquarters in Ogden, Utah.  It is a member of the Utah Bankers Association (UBA), the American Bankers Association (ABA), and the Federal Deposit Insurance Corporation (FDIC).  Branden P Hansen is president of Bank of Utah, as of January 2023.

The company ended 2022 with just over $2.4 billion in assets, which places it in the top 11 percent of banks in the nation for total assets. 

Bank of Utah is committed to being a well-capitalized institution with a sound financial base. This is reflected by Bauer Financial, Inc. (a national financial company that rates banks' financial statements), which has given Bank of Utah its highest possible rating — 5 out of 5 stars. The Bank's financial decision making has served the company well during times of economic downturns, stability, growth. 

Bank of Utah has over 400 employees helping customers from 18 full-service branches throughout Utah, additional trust offices in Ogden and Salt Lake City, and additional mortgage offices in Logan, Price and St. George. A digital team also ensures that customers can conveniently, quickly and safely open accounts online and manage their money.

History
Ogden businessman Frank M. Browning founded Bank of Utah on Dec. 1, 1952, with just 16 employees and less than $1 million in assets. His vision was to create a financial institution based on “relationship banking,” one that would be “friendly, innovative and available to all.” Today, the bank remains locally owned and operated, and the Browning family remains involved in the bank with Frank W. Browning as chairman of the board, Benjamin F. Browning as vice chairman of the board and CEO, and Jonathan W. Browning as secretary to the board.

Historically, Bank of Utah became the first bank in the state to issue a credit card, called the "Cred-O-Matic Shopping Plan." It was also the first Utah bank to become a "motor bank" by adding a drive-up teller window to its building.

Since its creation, Bank of Utah has acquired the following banks: Bank of Ben Lomond (1974), Bank of Brigham City (1978), Bank of Northern Utah (1978), First Commerce Bank (1999) and American Bank of Commerce (AmBank) (2018).

Business

Personal Banking
Offering a complete range of products for individuals and families, from checking and savings accounts, to CDs, to debit and credit cards. The bank also provides robust digital services, including online and mobile banking, financial management tools and the ability to open accounts online.

Business Banking
Offering a comprehensive suite of products to support business needs, including checking and savings accounts, debit and credit cards, treasury management services and merchant services.

Home Loans
Offering a variety of financing for homebuyers and homeowners, including loans to buy a home, build a home or purchase a lot; options to refinance an existing home loan; home equity lines of credit; and reverse mortgages.

Consumer and Personal Lending
Offering financing to make special purchases, cover expenses or consolidate debt, including  auto loans, RV loans, CD- and savings-secured loans, and unsecured loans.

Commercial Lending
Offering commercial real estate loans, business lines of credit and equipment loans to help businesses identify and create opportunities for growth, and meet short- and long-term goals.

Personal Trust and Investments
Offering fiduciary expertise to help customers administer a variety of trusts, estates and conservatorships, to secure wealth in retirement and complete the safe transfer of assets when the times comes.

Corporate Trust
Offering a broad spectrum of services, including escrows, owner trusts, security trusts, indenture trusts, life settlements, paying agent and collateral agent roles. The bank is one of the largest providers of aircraft owner trusts in the world, a commonly used, Federal Aviation Administration-compliant method of registering aircraft in the U.S.

Community Efforts
As a community bank, Bank of Utah has a longstanding tradition of partnering with customers, local businesses and organizations to strengthen local communities. 
Many bank employees serve on local boards and in leadership and advisory capacities for community development organizations across Utah. Bank of Utah also donates to, and volunteers with, a number of community agencies and events, from school foundations and nonprofits, to economic development and housing committees, to local concerts and community races, parades and fairs.
Two of Bank of Utah’s largest annual community support events are the Warm Bodies, Warm Souls clothing drive and Scouting for Food canned food drive.

Bank of Utah started Warm Bodies, Warm Souls in 2012. Over the years, Bank of Utah, along with community partners, has expanded the reach of the event through more locations and advertising support, and it is now one of the largest warm clothing drives in Utah. An online cash fund was added in 2021, to provide an additional way to give.

Since 2021, Bank of Utah has teamed up with the Boy Scouts of America (BSA) and other agencies for Utah’s Annual Scouting for Food Drive. This food drive always happens in February —a critical time when supplies at food banks and pantries need replenishing following the holiday season. Bank of Utah branches serve as donation sites throughout the food drive. In 2023, the bank created an online cash fund as a new way to give and supplement the drive.

References

External links

 Bank of Utah
 Aricraft Owner Trusts FAQ
| Information Regarding Aircraft Owner Trusts

Companies based in Ogden, Utah
Banks established in 1952
1952 establishments in Utah
Banks based in Utah